Barbara was a Palestinian Arab village in the Gaza Subdistrict located 17 km northeast of Gaza city, in the vicinity of modern Ashkelon. It had an entirely Arab population of 2,410 in 1945. The village consisted of nearly 14,000 dunums of which approximately 12,700 dunums was able to be cultivated. It was captured by Israel during the 1948 Arab–Israeli War.

History
Barbara received its modern name from the Romans. After the Roman rule the village was under the control of a number of empires and dynasties ranging from the Byzantines, various Islamic Arab dynasties, the Crusaders, the Turkish Mamluks and Ottomans and United Kingdom.

Archeological building and pottery remains from  the Late  Roman and the Byzantine periods have been excavated here. Coins minted under Nero,  Valentinian II,  Theodosius I, Justin I and Justinian I were also found. A winepress, dating from the Byzantine period has been found.

A coin, dating from the  Umayyad (697–750 CE) era has also been found here

According to the Arab geographer Mujir al-Din (1456–1522), the village was home to the Muslim scholar sheikh Yusuf al-Barbarawi, a local sage and a student of renowned scholar Ahmad ibn Dawud, who died in 1323.

Ottoman period
During the reign of the Ottoman Sultan Murad III (1574-1596), Barbara's only mosque was built. It contained the tomb of Yusuf al-Barbarawi. In the 1596  tax registers, Barbara was part of the nahiya (subdistrict) of Gaza under the liwa' (district) of Gaza. It had a population of 73 Muslim households, an estimated 402 persons. They paid a fixed sum of 17,000 akçe in tax, where all the revenue went to a Muslim charitable endowment.

The village appeared under the  name of Hababeh on the map that Pierre Jacotin compiled in 1799.

In May 1863, the French explorer Victor Guérin visited the village. He estimated it had 400 inhabitants. He further noted a  wali, dedicated to a Sheik Yusuf, with sections of ancient  white-grey marble columns. Further five -six sections of marble column were observed around the well. Socin found from an official Ottoman village list from about 1870  that  Barbara had a total of 113 houses and a population of 372, though the population count included men only.  Hartmann  found that Barbara  had 112  houses.

In 1883  the PEF's Survey of Western Palestine described Barbara as a village rectangular in shape and surrounded by gardens and two ponds. The sand encroaching from the coast was stopped by the cactus hedges of the gardens. To the east of the village there were olive groves.

A building, dating to the late Ottoman, or early  British Mandate era have been excavated.

British Mandate of Palestine
In the 1922 census of Palestine conducted by the British Mandate authorities, Barbara had a population of 1,369 inhabitants, all Muslims, which had increased in  the 1931 census  to 1546, still all Muslim, in 318 houses.

In the 1945 statistics  the population of Barbara consisted of  2,410 Muslims and the  land area was 13,978  dunams, according to an official land and population survey.  Of this, 132 dunams were designated for  citrus and bananas, 
2,952 for plantations and irrigable land, 9,615 for cereals, while 70 dunams were built-up areas.

At the end of the Mandate Period, the above-mentioned mosque, built late 1500, was still standing, and in addition the village center contained a number of shops. An elementary school was founded in 1921, and by 1947 it had 252 students. Barbara was also known for its long rugs, al-mazawid, which were woven by the women of the village.

1948 War
Barbara was captured by a possible combination of the Negev, Giv'ati and Yiftach brigades on November 5, 1948, during Operation Yoav. At the end of November 1948, Coastal Plain District troops carried  out  sweeps of the villages around and to the south of Majdal. Barbara was one of the villages named in the orders to the IDF battalions and engineers platoon, that the villagers were to be  expelled to Gaza, and the IDF troops were "to prevent their return by destroying their villages." The path leading to the village was to be mined. The IDF troops were ordered to carry out the operation "with determination, accuracy and energy". The operation took place on 30 November. The troops found "about 40" villagers in Barbara and al-Jiyya, "composed of women, old men and children", who offered no resistance.  They were expelled to Beit Hanun, in the northern Gaza strip. Eight young men who were found were sent to a POW camp.

Following the war the area was incorporated into the State of Israel and the moshavim of Mavki'im and Talmei Yafeh were established on the former village's land. According to the Palestinian historian Walid Khalidi (1992), the village remaining structures on the village land are: 
"The crumbled walls and debris of houses are all that remains of the village buildings. The debris is overgrown with thorns and brush. Old eucalyptus and sycamore trees and cactuses also grow on the site. Some of the old streets are clearly identifiable. One area of the site serves as a garbage dump and a junkyard for old cars. The surrounding lands are planted by Israeli farmers in corn."

See also
Kamal Adwan
Abdel Jabbar Adwan
Depopulated Palestinian locations in Israel

References

Bibliography

  (p. 876 )

External links
Welcome to Barbara Palestine Remembered
 Barbara,  Zochrot
Survey of Western Palestine, Map 20:   IAA, Wikimedia commons 
Barbara, from the Khalil Sakakini Cultural Center

District of Gaza
Arab villages depopulated during the 1948 Arab–Israeli War